Drymoana blanchardi is a species of sedge moth in the genus Drymoana. It was described by John B. Heppner in 1985. It is found in southern North America including Florida, Georgia, Louisiana, Mississippi, New Jersey, South Carolina and Texas

References

Moths described in 1985
Glyphipterigidae